The United States has ten protected areas known as national seashores and three known as national lakeshores, which are public lands operated by the National Park Service (NPS), an agency of the Department of the Interior. National seashores and lakeshores are coastal areas federally designated by Congress as being of natural and recreational significance as a preserved area. All of the national lakeshores are on Lakes Michigan and Superior, and nine of the ten national seashores are on the Atlantic Ocean, including two on the Gulf of Mexico. Point Reyes is the only national seashore on the Pacific coast. While all of these protected sites have extensive beaches for recreation, they extend inland to include other natural resources like wetlands and marshes, forests, lakes and lagoons, and dunes. Many also feature historic lighthouses and estates.  

National seashores are located in ten states and national lakeshores are in two other states. Florida, North Carolina, and Michigan each have two. These thirteen sites had a total visitation of 21.1 million people in 2017, led by Cape Cod at over 4 million visitors. The lakeshores and seashores have an emphasis on recreation, and most allow hunting and off-road vehicles, which is not permitted in national parks. Five seashores and lakeshores also include land more strictly protected as wilderness areas.

Shorelines, both on oceans and lakes, are particularly vulnerable to natural change. National seashores have experienced higher temperatures than in the past, with even hotter summers expected from the effects of climate change. All nine seashores on the Atlantic and Gulf of Mexico feature low-lying barrier islands, which could be submerged by rising sea levels, and storm surges from severe hurricanes can disintegrate the beaches. Warmer temperatures at the Great Lakes may result in continued drop in water levels, with unclear effects on the shoreline. The Natural Resources Defense Council states that long-term planning for all sites must address erosion and visitor access.

History 
The first federal protection of shoreline in the U.S. for public recreation purposes was in 1930, when Congress established "the principle of conserving the natural beauty of shore lines for recreational use" in northern Minnesota. With a push for job-creating conservation programs during the Great Depression, the National Park Service expanded its role in managing national parks and national monuments to protecting historic sites and recreation areas, including coastlines. Its work controlling erosion at North Carolina's Outer Banks led to it considering designation of Cape Hatteras, where not only beach-going but also fishing and hunting were already popular, as a national beach or national recreation area, but debate over the meaning of this status and how the land would be acquired by the NPS delayed action, as existing and expected development made it unsuitable for a national park. The 1936 Park, Parkway, and Recreational Area Study Act gave the Park Service a framework to designate and protect a wider variety of resources that included recreational land use. Congress authorized Cape Hatteras National Seashore in August 1937, and President Roosevelt signed the bill before visiting Roanoke Island. It was not established, however, until 1953 and dedicated in 1958 after permission to hunt was determined, the land was purchased and donated to the Park Service, and ongoing funding was authorized, but the process would serve as an example for how to create and manage similar dual-purpose sites.

A 1955 NPS survey of the Atlantic and Gulf coasts recommended sixteen areas that would be worthy of protection, five of which would become national seashores. Studies of the Great Lakes and Pacific coast also led to designations, including Pictured Rocks, authorized as the first national lakeshore in 1966. Funds from the Bureau of Outdoor Recreation and the Mission 66 program drove system expansion and land acquisition by the Park Service. Altogether thirteen further national seashores and lakeshores would be authorized and established, all in the 1960s and 1970s. The 1961 law authorizing Cape Cod National Seashore was the first to include appropriations for purchasing land; to prevent local opposition it limited removal of private property and established an advisory commission with local representation, an innovation used for others. The creation of Cape Cod recognized the importance of commitment to preserving entire areas threatened by development, even as philosophical questions of uniqueness, national importance, and protection of an urbanized area were raised. The national lakeshores, seashores, and riverways, although lacking recognizable monuments, would be rare coastal areas kept in more pristine condition. Their geologic features and biological significance of diverse plant life was also important for gaining federal protection. 

The newest national lakeshore or seashore is Canaveral, established in 1975. There is one former national lakeshore, renamed Indiana Dunes National Park in 2019 in a bid to increase visibility and tourism to the area despite the Park Service's naming conventions. Other national parks that include coastal areas, such as Olympic and Acadia National Parks, emphasize conservation over recreation, though the enabling legislation for seashores and lakeshores vary in the degree to which the two are stressed.

National seashores

National lakeshores

See also
List of areas in the United States National Park System
List of national monuments of the United States
List of national parks of the United States
History of the National Park Service
National Wilderness Preservation System

References

External links

 of the National Park Service
Find a Park by the NPS

Lakeshore
 
 
National Lakeshores